Eupsilia vinulenta, the straight-toothed sallow moth, is a moth in the family Noctuidae described by Augustus Radcliffe Grote in 1864. It is found in North America.

The MONA or Hodges number for Eupsilia vinulenta is 9933.

References

Further reading
Arnett, Ross H. (2000). American Insects: A Handbook of the Insects of America North of Mexico. CRC Press.
Lafontaine, J. Donald & Schmidt, B. Christian (2010). "Annotated check list of the Noctuoidea (Insecta, Lepidoptera) of North America north of Mexico". ZooKeys. vol. 40, 1–239.

External links
Butterflies and Moths of North America

Noctuinae